The Battle of Inō was a battle fought during the Sengoku period (16th century) of Japan. 
The battle was fought in Owari Province, in what is now Nishi-ku, Nagoya, between two forces of the Oda clan: the head of the clan Oda Nobunaga and his brother Oda Nobuyuki, who with the support of Oda Nobuyasu, Shibata Katsuie and Hayashi Hidesada, rebelled against Nobunaga. 

The three conspirators were defeated at the Battle of Inō, but they were pardoned after the intervention of Tsuchida Gozen, the birth mother of both Nobunaga and Nobuyuki. 

Nobuyuki began his second rebellion in 1557, but was defeated and his Suemori Castle was destroyed by Nobunaga's retainer Ikeda Nobuteru. 

In 1558, however, Nobuyuki again planned to rebel. When Nobunaga was informed of this by Shibata Katsuie, he faked illness to get close to Nobuyuki and assassinated him in Kiyosu Castle.

References 

1556 in Japan
Ino
Conflicts in 1556